Pero Blazevski (born September 28, 1972) is a former Macedonian professional basketball player who played for many clubs in Macedonia like MZT Skopje, Rabotnicki, Kumanovo and many more. He was also member of Macedonia national basketball team.

External links
 
 :it:Pero Blaževski

References

1972 births
Living people
KB Prishtina players
KK MZT Skopje players
KK Rabotnički players
Macedonian men's basketball players
Shooting guards
Sportspeople from Skopje
Helios Suns players